XEWV-FM is a radio station in Mexicali, Baja California, broadcasting on 106.7 MHz.

History
XEWV-FM received its concession in June 1965 for operation on 89.6 MHz. At the time, Mexico had licensed several radio stations on even decimal FM frequencies, which were never used in the United States. By 1970, all of the even decimal stations had been relocated to odd-numbered frequencies or had disappeared; XEWV was relocated to 106.7 MHz. In 1974, Cadena Baja California (now known as Grupo Cadena) bought XEWV-AM-FM.

After 27 years of regional Mexican music as Fiesta Mexicana, on September 9, 2011, XEWV-FM flipped to the More FM format, which debuted in Tijuana on sister station XHMORE-FM in 1994.

In 2020, XEWV-FM changed names and relaunched as pop station Suena FM 106.7. On April 29, 2022, Grupo Cadena ceased broadcast operations on its terrestrial stations on Mexicali.

References

Spanish-language radio stations
Radio stations in Mexicali